The 2006–07 season was the 28th season of the Football Conference.

Overview
This season saw the promotion of Dagenham & Redbridge and Morecambe to the Football League for the first time, whilst Droylsden, Farsley Celtic, Histon and Salisbury City were promoted to the Conference National for the first time in their history.

At the end of the season Scarborough and Farnborough Town went out of business, whilst Hayes and Yeading merged to form a new club, Hayes & Yeading United and Moor Green merged with Southern League side Solihull Borough to form Solihull Moors (which took Moor Green's place in the Conference North).

Oxford United drew the biggest crowds, with an average of 6,332 spectators and a peak of 11,065 in their match against Woking. Exeter City came second far behind them, with an average of 3,627, just beating Oxford's average with a peak of 6,670 in their match against Southport. Other teams could not match Oxford's average even in their most popular matches.

Conference National

A total of 24 teams contested the division, including 18 sides from last season, two relegated from the Football League Two, two promoted from the Conference North and two promoted from the Conference South.

Promotion and relegation
Teams promoted from 2005–06 Conference North
 Northwich Victoria
 Stafford Rangers

Teams promoted from 2005–06 Conference South
 Weymouth
 St Albans City

Teams relegated from 2005–06 Football League Two
 Oxford United
 Rushden & Diamonds

League table

Locations

Results

Play-offs

Top scorers in order of league goals

Source:

Conference North

A total of 22 teams contested the division, including 19 sides from last season, one relegated from the Conference National and two promoted from the Northern Premier League.

Promotion and relegation
Teams promoted from 2005–06 Northern Premier League
 Blyth Spartans
 Farsley Celtic

Teams relegated from 2005–06 Conference National
 Scarborough

League table

Locations

Results

Play-offs

Conference South

A total of 22 teams contested the division, including 18 sides from last season, two promoted from the Isthmian League and two promoted from the Southern Football League.

Promotion and relegation
Teams promoted from 2005–06 Southern Football League
 Salisbury City
 Bedford Town

Teams promoted from 2005–06 Isthmian League
 Braintree Town
 Fisher Athletic

League table

Locations

Results

Play-offs

References

External links
 Nationwide Conference

 
National League (English football) seasons
5
English